A cinematheque is an archive of films and film-related objects with an exhibition venue. Similarly to a book library (bibliothèque in French), a cinematheque is responsible for preserving and making available to the public film heritage. Typically, a cinematheque has at least one motion picture theatre, which offers screenings of its collections and other international films.

History 
From the first cinema screenings until 1930, several attempts to establish film archives were initiated in Europe, the USA and Russia. As early as 1898, the photographer and cameraman Bolesław Matuszewski evoked the idea of a film archive. "It is a matter of giving this perhaps privileged source of history the same authority, the same official existence, the same access as to other archives already known". The "Archives of the Planet” (Les Archives de la planète) were established by Albert Kahn, between 1912 and 1931. Military film archives were also created in France, Germany and Great Britain after the First World War. The cinematheque of the city of Paris, for educational purposes, was created in 1925.

However, it was not until the 1930s and the awareness of the destruction of films at the time of the transition to sound movies that the first film archives emerged. Some of the first formal film archives were created: in Stockholm in 1933, the Reichsfilmarchiv in Berlin in 1934, the National Film Library in London and the Film Library at the Museum of Modern Art in New York in 1935, the Cinémathèque française in Paris created in 1936. In 1938, the International Federation of Film Archives was created, bringing together institutions devoted to cinematographic heritage. On 27 October 1980, the General Conference of UNESCO adopted the "Recommendation for the Safeguarding and Preservation of Moving Images" which recognizes the need to preserve and provide access to cinematographic heritage. In 1991, the Association of European Cinematheques (ACE - Association des Cinémathèques Européennes) was established.

Africa
Morocco

 Tangier Cinematheque at Cinema Rif in Tangier

America

 Canada
 Cinémathèque québécoise in Montreal
 The Cinematheque in Vancouver
 TIFF Cinematheque in Toronto
 Cinematheque Waterloo in Waterloo
 Winnipeg Film Group's Cinematheque in Winnipeg

 United States of America
 UCLA Film and Television Archive in Los Angeles
 American Cinematheque in Los Angeles
 San Francisco Cinematheque in San Francisco
 Gene Siskel Film Center in Chicago
 Cleveland Cinematheque in Cleveland
 University of Virginia Cinematheque in Charlottesville
 Cinematheque at University of Wisconsin–Madison

Mexico
 Cineteca Nacional in Mexico City
 Filmoteca de la UNAM in Mexico City

 Other countries in America
 Cinemateca Distrital de Bogotá in Bogotá, Colombia
 Cinemateca Uruguaya in Montevideo, Uruguay
 Cinemateca Nacional de Venezuela in Caracas, Venezuela
 Cinemateca Brasileira in São Paulo, Brazil
Filmoteca PUCP in Lima, Perú

Asia

 China
 China Film Archive in Beijing

 Indonesia
 Sinematek Indonesia in Jakarta

 Iran
 Tehran Cinematheque in Tehran
 Pardis Gholhak Cinematheque in Tehran

 Israel
 Jerusalem Cinematheque in Jerusalem
 Tel Aviv Cinematheque in Tel Aviv
 Haifa Cinematheque in Haifa
 Herzliya Cinematheque in Herzliya
 Holon Cinematheque in Holon
 Sderot Cinematheque in Sderot
 Rosh Pina Cinematheque in Rosh Pinna

 Singapore
 Asian Film Archive in Singapore

 South Korea
 Korean Film Archive in Seoul
 Cinematheque Busan in Busan

 Vietnam
 Hanoi Cinematheque in Hanoi

Australia
 Australian Cinémathèque in the Queensland Gallery of Modern Art, Brisbane, Queensland
 Melbourne Cinematheque in Melbourne, Victoria
 Adelaide Cinémathèque in the Mercury Cinema, Adelaide, South Australia

Europe
 ACE - Association des Cinémathèques Européennes, an affiliation of 49 national and regional European cinematheques.

 Armenia
Armenian National Cinematheque in Yerevan

 Belgium
Cinémathèque royale de Belgique in Brussels

 Bulgaria
Bulgarian National Film Archive (Българска Национална Филмотека) in Sofia

 Czech Republic
Národní filmový archiv in Prague (and its Ponrepo cinema)

 Denmark
Cinemateket in Copenhagen

 France
Cinémathèque Française in Paris
 Cinémathèque de Bretagne in Brest
 

 Germany
Deutsche Kinemathek in Berlin, 
DFF Deutsches Filmnstitut & Filmmuseum in Frankfurt
Filmmuseum Potsdam Institut der Filmuniversität Babelsberg KONRAD WOLF in Potsdam
Film Museum München in Munich
Filmmuseum der Landeshauptstadt Düsseldorf in Düsseldorf

 Italy
Cineteca Nazionale in Rome
Cineteca Italiana in Milan
Cineteca di Bologna in Bologna

 Luxembourg
Cinémathèque de la Ville de Luxembourg in Luxembourg City

 Norway
Cinemateket in Oslo
Cinemateket in Trondheim

 Poland
Iluzjon - Film Art Museum in Warsaw

 Portugal
Cinemateca Portuguesa in Lisbon

 Romania
Arhiva Nationala de Filme - Cinemateca in Bucharest

 Serbia
Yugoslav Film Archive in Belgrade

 Slovenia
Slovenska kinoteka in Ljubljana

 Spain 
Filmoteca de Catalunya in Barcelona
Filmoteca Española in Madrid

 Sweden
Cinemateket in Stockholm

 Ukraine
Oleksandr Dovzhenko National Centre in Kyiv

 United Kingdom
British Film Institute in London

 Switzerland
Cinémathèque suisse in Lausanne

See also
 Lists of film archives

References

External links 

 International Federation of Film Archives - Official Website
ACE - Association des Cinémathèques Européennes - Official Website
 The Cinematheque - Official Website
 Cinematheque Ontario - Official Website
 Cinematheque Waterloo - Official Website
 Winnipeg Film Group's Cinematheque - Official Website
 Korean Film Archive - Official Website
 Australian Cinémathèque - Official Website
 Swedish Cinematheque - Official Website
 Slovenian Cinematheque - Official Website

 
 
Film organizations